Hotel Splendide is a 1932 British comedy drama film directed by Michael Powell. It was made as a Quota quickie.

Plot
Jerry Mason inherits the Hotel Splendide at Speymouth but is disappointed when he sees it is a quiet place with few permanent residents. Gentleman Charlie, a jewel thief arrives after a long spell in prison expecting to be able to dig up the pearls he had buried - only to find the hotel has been built on the site.

Cast
 Jerry Verno as Jerry Mason
 Anthony Holles as 'Mrs.LeGrange'
 Edgar Norfolk as 'Gentleman Charlie'
 Philip Morant as Mr.Meek
 Sybil Grove as Mrs.Harkness
 Vera Sherborne as Joyce Dacre
 Paddy Browne as Miss Meek
 Michael Powell as Bugging device engineer (uncredited)

Production
Made for £4,000 for Gaumont-British, the film features one of the earliest cinematic uses of Gounod's "Funeral March of the Marionettes", better known as the theme music for Alfred Hitchcock Presents.

Critical reception
In contemporary reviews, Picturegoer Weekly wrote, "Jerry Verno is an efficient and funny comedian...What laughter there is is easily accounted for but the scenes that are supposed to be thrilling miss the mark"; Kine Weekly wrote, "Comedy and thrills are adequately blended in a somewhat far-fetched crook story. Acting is quite good, presentation fair. A light second feature, of which cheeriness is the keynote, is indicated"; and The Bioscope wrote, "Here is one of those unostentatiously produced British pot-boilers, made with an eye on the cash-box, which may be expected to hold its own in the family house, chiefly as a second feature. Its light comedy and mystery atmosphere will get it past an unsophisticated audience."

References

Notes

Bibliography

 Chibnal, Steve. Quota Quickies : The Birth of the British 'B' Film. London: BFI, 2007. 
 Powell, Michael. A Life in Movies: An Autobiography. London: Heinemann, 1986. .

External links

Hotel Splendide reviews and articles at the Powell & Pressburger Pages

1932 films
Films directed by Michael Powell
Films by Powell and Pressburger
1932 comedy-drama films
British comedy-drama films
British black-and-white films
1930s English-language films
1930s British films